The Kingdom Centre is the main shopping destination in Glenrothes, located in the town centre.

The shopping centre has some of the highest levels of footfall in Fife and currently contains over 100 shop units as well as a variety of cafes, the town's central library and the Rothes Halls - the town's theatre and civic centre. Brand stores in the Kingdom Centre include Boots, CEX, Clarks, Game, Home Bargains, Iceland, JD Sports, New Look, Sports Direct, Superdrug, Toytown,  Trespass and WHSmith. The centre also has a wide selection of smaller independent retailers, food and drink outlets, banks, building societies and other service operators.

A bingo hall, cinema and ten pin bowling alley sit adjacent to the shopping complex. Glenrothes bus station is located next to the southeast end of the centre. An M&S Foodhall, an Iceland Food Warehouse, and a parade of shops and restaurants were completed in early 2019 sitting adjacent to the shopping centre at The Henge Retail and Leisure Park. Starbucks and Burger King also opened outlets on North Street in 2021.

History

Phase 1
Glenrothes town centre was originally to be built on the same principles of the English new towns such as Stevenage and Bracknell. The centre would comprise a series of shopping streets and squares separated from traffic. The first phase of the Kingdom Centre was built as a large modern pedestrian square. A three-storey glazed roof and a modern fountain were incorporated as features in the design. The Golden Acorn Hotel, the town's Post Office and a bus turning circle were all included as part of the development. A Co-Op Department store opened in 1964 at the eastern entrance to the square and a town clock was built as a feature adjacent to the store.

Phase 2

The design of the first phase had a number of problems, including a leaking glass roof on the main square, vandalising of the public fountain and experiencing wind tunnel effects due to open and exposed entrances to the square. In 1976 a decision was taken to remove the glazed roof and the fountain and roof over the square at shop fascia height creating an internalised space. The shopping centre was also extended west to the point where Falkland Square is now. A Woolworths store (now Home Bargains) was built to anchor the west end of the centre. A Presto supermarket (latterly Safeway and then Dunnes Stores) and the New Glenrothes House office block were built as later additions to the second phase.

Phase 3

In 1982 a third phase was built extending the centre further west. The domed Unicorn Square was the principal feature of the third phase and Unicorn House, an office block with distinctive reflective glass, was built to the north of the development. A Fine Fare supermarket (now sub-divided into New Look, Toytown and One Below outlets) anchored the third phase of the shopping centre when it opened.

Phase 4

In 1993, with the winding up of the Glenrothes Development Corporation (GDC) on the horizon, a fourth phase was built. This was partially funded with a central government grant to provide any last major projects for the new town. The fourth phase incorporated the Rothes Halls, a multi-purpose community facility with a café, theatre, library and conference facilities.

A major feature of the fourth phase is Rothes Square complete with a pyramid-shaped glass roof, a hanging triangular clock, circular feature floor design and a mock "alfresco" style café. A Somerfield supermarket (latterly a Co-op but currently vacant) anchored the fourth phase of the centre when it first opened.

Future proposals
A range of development projects are proposed to regenerate the town centre steered by a masterplan that was approved by the Glenrothes Area Committee in March 2021. This seeks to address a variety of negative trends including addressing the loss of shops and a halving of office floorspace since the year 2000. Celebrating the unique legacy of public art bequeathed to the town, introducing new business opportunities outside of the Kingdom Shopping Centre, creating new public spaces, including a new town square, and supporting an enhanced economy are also identified in the masterplan. This supersedes an earlier Glenrothes town centre action plan that was approved at Glenrothes Area Committee in 2014. Older parts of the Kingdom Shopping Centre at Albany Gate are proposed to be demolished.

References and notes

External links
Kingdom Centre website 

Shopping centres in Fife
1963 establishments in Scotland
Shopping malls established in 1963
Glenrothes